Battle of Newtonia may refer to two conflicts fought in Newton County, Missouri, during the American Civil War:
First Battle of Newtonia, fought on September 30, 1862
Second Battle of Newtonia, fought on October 28, 1864